Lissoclinum perforatum is a species of tunicate. The species was originally described by Alfred Mathieu Giard in 1872

References

Taxa named by Alfred Mathieu Giard
Animals described in 1872
Aplousobranchia